"Mine Would Be You" is a song written by Jessi Alexander, Connie Harrington, and Deric Ruttan and recorded by American country music artist Blake Shelton. It was released in July 2013 as the third single from Shelton's 2013 album Based on a True Story…. The song reached number one the US Billboard Country Airplay chart.

Content
"Mine Would Be You" is a mid-tempo ballad in which the male asks his lover about her thoughts, with the final verse revealing that she is actually departing him. The song is set in the key of C major with a vocal range from G3 to E5. The verses are in alternating measures of 3/4 and 4/4 time signatures.

Critical reception
Billy Dukes of Taste of Country gave the song five stars out of five, writing that "Shelton’s performance is as easy and satisfying as ‘Honey Bee,’ but during each chorus he opens up full-throttle to send a desperate message to the woman he’s longing for." Chuck Dauphin of Roughstock gave the song a favorable review, calling it "the best song on the album."

Commercial performance
"Mine Would Be You" debuted at number 37 on the U.S. Billboard Hot Country Songs chart for the week of April 13, 2013. It also appeared at number 42 on the Country Airplay chart for the week of August 3, 2013. It also debuted at number 100 on the U.S. Billboard Hot 100 chart for the week of August 17, 2013. For the week of November 4, 2013 it became Shelton's 10th consecutive number one hit on the Country Airplay chart, tying Brad Paisley for the longest consecutive streak of chart-topping singles.  As of January 2014, the songs has sold 823,000 copies in the United States. It was certified Platinum by the RIAA for a million units in sales and streams.

It also debuted at number 79 on the Canadian Hot 100 chart for the week of August 24, 2013.

Charts

Year-end charts

Certifications

References

2013 singles
Country ballads
2010s ballads
Blake Shelton songs
Songs written by Jessi Alexander
Songs written by Connie Harrington
Songs written by Deric Ruttan
Song recordings produced by Scott Hendricks
Warner Records Nashville singles
2013 songs
Canadian Country Music Association Songwriter(s) of the Year winners